Santa Venetia is a census-designated place (CDP) in Marin County, California, United States. The population was 4,289 at the 2020 census.

Geography
It is bordered to the south and west by the city of San Rafael (the county seat) and to the east by San Pablo Bay, the northern part of the San Francisco Bay estuary. Gallinas Creek forms the northern edge of the community, and the eastern part of the CDP is occupied by China Camp State Park.

The main road of the community is North San Pedro Road, which passes by the Frank Lloyd Wright-designed Marin County Civic Center. The road runs east through China Camp State Park, along the bay through Peacock Gap, and ends in San Rafael. Santa Venetia has an open space preserve for its marsh as it borders San Pablo Bay.

History
Santa Venetia is built on marshland that was filled in 1914. At that time, real estate developer Mabry McMahan envisioned a bayside luxury development modeled after Venice, Italy. Venice is known as "Venezia" in Italian; however, there is no actual Christian saint ("Santa") named Venice or Venetia. The development was designed to be complete with canals and gondolas. The economic decline following the First World War put an end to the project.

It was only after the Second World War that significant development took place in Santa Venetia, with suburban developments such as Gallinas Village being built on the land originally filled in 1914.

Santa Venetia was home to the local YMCA until it was destroyed by a fire in 1986. Eventually the property was purchased by a developer who erected residential houses that were completed in 1987.

During the 1960s and 1970s the area was known affectionately to residents, especially teenagers, as "Lower Scabo" and "Upper Scabo".

Today Santa Venetia is a quiet neighborhood with a rural feel. Residents treasure its proximity to China Camp State Park, and many homes along the canal have water access.

Demographics

2010
At the 2010 census Santa Venetia had a population of 4,292. The racial makeup of Santa Venetia was 3,335 (77.7%) White, 88 (2.1%) African American, 27 (0.6%) Native American, 306 (7.1%) Asian, 16 (0.4%) Pacific Islander, 350 (8.2%) from other races, and 170 (4.0%) from two or more races. Hispanic or Latino of any race were 815 people (19.0%).

The census reported that 4,080 people (95.1% of the population) lived in households, 65 (1.5%) lived in non-institutionalized group quarters, and 147 (3.4%) were institutionalized.

There were 1,655 households, 480 (29.0%) had children under the age of 18 living in them, 769 (46.5%) were opposite-sex married couples living together, 180 (10.9%) had a female householder with no husband present, 81 (4.9%) had a male householder with no wife present.  There were 87 (5.3%) unmarried opposite-sex partnerships, and 21 (1.3%) same-sex married couples or partnerships. 455 households (27.5%) were one person and 228 (13.8%) had someone living alone who was 65 or older. The average household size was 2.47.  There were 1,030 families (62.2% of households); the average family size was 2.97.

The age distribution was 802 people (18.7%) under the age of 18, 220 people (5.1%) aged 18 to 24, 961 people (22.4%) aged 25 to 44, 1,435 people (33.4%) aged 45 to 64, and 874 people (20.4%) who were 65 or older.  The median age was 47.7 years. For every 100 females, there were 90.2 males.  For every 100 females age 18 and over, there were 87.1 males.

There were 1,706 housing units at an average density of 463.6 per square mile, of the occupied units 1,188 (71.8%) were owner-occupied and 467 (28.2%) were rented. The homeowner vacancy rate was 1.1%; the rental vacancy rate was 2.1%.  2,925 people (68.2% of the population) lived in owner-occupied housing units and 1,155 people (26.9%) lived in rental housing units.

2000
At the 2000 census there were 4,298 people, 1,646 households, and 1,048 families in the CDP. The racial makeup of the CDP in 2010 was 68.5% non-Hispanic White, 2.0% non-Hispanic African American, 0.2% Native American, 7.0% Asian, 0.3% Pacific Islander, 0.3% from other races, and 2.6% from two or more races. Hispanic or Latino of any race were 19.0%.

Of the 1,646 households 25.5% had children under the age of 18 living with them, 49.0% were married couples living together, 10.6% had a female householder with no husband present, and 36.3% were non-families. 26.2% of households were one person and 12.7% were one person aged 65 or older. The average household size was 2.47 and the average family size was 2.91.

The age distribution was 18.1% under the age of 18, 5.2% from 18 to 24, 27.3% from 25 to 44, 29.1% from 45 to 64, and 20.3% 65 or older. The median age was 45 years. For every 100 females, there were 93.0 males. For every 100 females age 18 and over, there were 87.5 males.

The median household income was $75,600 and the median family income  was $77,202. Males had a median income of $48,938 versus $42,500 for females. The per capita income for the CDP was $34,732. About 4.3% of families and 7.3% of the population were below the poverty line, including 10.3% of those under age 18 and 6.1% of those age 65 or over.

Notable residents
 Science fiction author Philip K. Dick lived in Santa Venetia from 1967 to 1972. During this time, Dick was using methamphetamine and other drugs quite heavily, living semi-communally with a rotating group of mostly teenage drug users. His experiences during this time formed much of the basis for his novel A Scanner Darkly.
 Charles "Chuck" Riley, one of the two perpetrators of the 1975 "BBQ murders", lived in Santa Venetia up until the time of his arrest and eventual imprisonment. Riley and his girlfriend Marlene Olive murdered her adoptive parents, James and Naomi Olive, in Terra Linda and disposed of the bodies by burning them in a firepit in nearby China Camp State Park.

Santa Venetia Neighborhood Association
The SVNA is an active neighborhood association. It describes its mission as "preserv[ing] and promot[ing] the quality of life in the Santa Venetia community". This is achieved by "encouraging healthy social interaction; facilitating the flow of information; and protecting the natural beauty and economic well-being of the community".

The SVNA holds regular community meetings, hosts social events and neighborhood work days and publishes a bi-monthly newsletter.

References

Census-designated places in Marin County, California
Census-designated places in California